Poinguinim was one of the 40 Goa Legislative Assembly constituencies of the state of Goa in southern India. It fell under the North Goa Lok Sabha constituency.

Members of Legislative Assembly 
 1989: Vasu Gaonkar, Indian National Congress
 1994: Acharya Govind Raghuchandra, Maharashtrawadi Gomantak Party
 1999: Isidore Diogo Fernandes, Independent
 2002: Isidore Diogo Fernandes, Indian National Congress
 200? (By Poll): Isidore Diogo Fernandes, Bharatiya Janata Party
 2005 (By Poll): Ramesh Tawadkar, Bharatiya Janata Party
 2007: Ramesh Tawadkar, Bharatiya Janata Party

Election results

2007

See also
Canacona (Goa Assembly constituency)

References

Former assembly constituencies of Goa